J. Robert Welsh Power Plant is a 1-gigawatt (1,056 MW), coal power plant located east of Pittsburg, Texas in Titus County, Texas. It is operated by SWEPCO, a subsidiary of AEP. The plant is named after J. Robert Welsh, a former President and Board Chairman of SWEPCO.

History
Welsh Power Plant had three units constructed: Unit 1 began operations in 1977, Unit 2 began operations in 1980, and Unit 3 began operations in 1982. All three units were installed with boilers from Babcock & Wilcox and turbines from Westinghouse. Combined, the three units had an operating capacity of 1,674 MW.

In 2012, AEP announced they were reducing output at Unit 2 to coincide with the commencement of commercial operations at John W. Turk Jr. Coal Plant in Arkansas. Unit 2 was officially decommissioned in April 2016 as a part of a major retrofitting project to comply with the Environmental Protection Agency's (EPA) Mercury and Air Toxics Standards (MATS) for Units 1 and 3. It is currently scheduled to stop burning coal in 2028.

The remaining two units use sub-bituminous coal mined from the Powder River Basin shipped via rail.

Close to it, there is Welsh HVDC Converter Station, a back-to-back HVDC station.

See also

 List of power stations in Texas

References

Energy infrastructure completed in 1977
Energy infrastructure completed in 1980
Energy infrastructure completed in 1982
Buildings and structures in Titus County, Texas
Coal-fired power stations in Texas
1977 establishments in Texas